Jordan Romero (born July 12, 1996) is an American mountain climber who was 13 years old when he reached the summit of Mount Everest. Romero was accompanied by his father, Paul Romero, his step-mother, Karen Lundgren, and three Sherpas, Ang Pasang Sherpa, Lama Dawa Sherpa, and Lama Karma Sherpa. The previous record for youngest to climb Everest was held by Ming Kipa of Nepal who was 15 years old when she reached the summit on May 22, 2003.

Upon successfully hiking the Vinson Massif in December 2011 at the age of 15 years, 5 months, 12 days, Romero became the youngest climber in the world to complete the Seven Summits (the highest mountains on each of the continents), a title previously held by George Atkinson. After this experience, Romero wrote a novel for children called ‘No Summit Out Of Sight’.

Mountains climbed 

Romero is now trying to climb the highest point in each of the 50 US states. He had already climbed Denali in June 2008. (see also Peak bagging (Climbing list))

Personal life
Romero grew up in Big Bear Lake, California, and currently resides in Salt Lake City, Utah. He was born to Paul Romero and Leigh Anne Drake.

Historic climb

Prior to climbing Everest, Romero had already climbed five of the seven highest peaks in the world in his desire to scale the tallest peaks on the seven continents (counting two for Oceania). He finished the seven summits with Mount Vinson in Antarctica at age 15. Before climbing Everest, Romero's highest peak was Aconcagua,  in elevation. His group chose a northern route out of Tibet and carried a GPS tracking device and satellite phone. Along the way to the top, Romero conducted an interview from an intermediate base camp 18,700 feet above sea level. Upon reaching Mount Everest's summit, a Skype interview was accomplished and Romero also called his mother, who had been following the climb on a map which included GPS coordinates, pictures and video.

Criticism
Before he climbed Mount Everest, there was some criticism over whether a 13-year-old boy should be allowed to attempt this. David Hillebrandt, medical adviser to the British Mountaineering Council, questioned whether Romero was mentally mature enough and then went on to say, "It is totally against the spirit of true mountaineering. This sounds like it's about mass marketing, money and it's verging on child abuse. Nowadays, people are effectively being winched up (the mountains), using ropes that Sherpas have put in for them. It will all be done for him (Romero). He's a token passenger." Because Nepal does not issue permits to people under 16 years of age, Romero and his team decided to climb from the Tibet side. On June 10, 2010, the Lhasa-based Chinese Tibet Mountaineering Association (CTMA), the official channel through which climbers must apply for permission to attempt peaks in Tibet, announced future age restrictions for all those attempting Everest from the north.

Book
After Romero climbed Mount Everest, he and Katherine Blanc wrote a book The Boy Who Conquered Everest: The Jordan Romero Story. At the end of 2014 Romero with Linda LeBlanc wrote another book No Summit out of Sight: The True Story of the Youngest Person to Climb the Seven Summits.

See also
Matt Moniz, did 50 State Summits in 43 days with his father
Malavath Purna, summited Mount Everest at age 13
Tyler Armstrong, youngest person to climb Aconcagua in Argentina at the age of 9

References

External links
 Official website
 Flickr
 XDance Film
 Children's book: The Boy Who Conquered Everest

1996 births
Living people
American mountain climbers
American summiters of Mount Everest
Summiters of the Seven Summits
American male writers
Sportspeople from San Bernardino County, California
Writers from California
People from Redlands, California
Sportspeople from Salt Lake City
People from Big Bear Lake, California